Suchindra Bali is an Indian actor who has appeared in Tamil language films.

Career
Suchindra is the son of former 1950s and 1960s actress Vyjayanthimala and Chamanlal Bali. He was born in Mumbai, did his schooling in Chennai, moved to Delhi for college and then went to the United States for higher studies. He's a law graduate from Law Centre II, Dhaula Kuan (University of Delhi). After completing his studies, he returned to Delhi where he started modelling.

Several acting sessions and dance classes later, he entered into Tamil cinema industry. Acting was the last thing on Suchin's mind, one day his photograph appeared in a Tamil daily and was seen by a producer who came to sign him for a movie. His first movie as a guest role was Kannodu Kanbathellam, where he shared frames with Arjun Sarja and his second film was Mugavaree with Ajith Kumar. He also worked with Nana Patekar, his debut Bollywood movie was Aanch, directed by Rajesh Singh.

His Tamil next venture was Ninaithale, directed by Viswas Sundar. It was his first Tamil movie as solo hero.

Filmography

References

External links 
 http://timesofindia.indiatimes.com/articleshow/24645172.cms
 http://www.rediff.com/entertai/2001/mar/19bali.htm
 

1976 births
Living people
Indian male film actors
Tamil male actors
Columbia Law School alumni
Male actors from Mumbai